The Association of Scientific Workers (AScW) was a trade union in the United Kingdom. It was founded as the National Union of Scientific Workers in 1918, changing its name to the Association of Scientific Workers in 1927.

The union largely represented laboratory and technical workers in universities, the National Health Service and in chemical and metal manufacturing. It was the union for scientists with a conscience, and could name half-a-dozen Nobel Prize winners amongst its membership. The former Prime Minister of the United Kingdom Margaret Thatcher was also a member.

In 1969 AScW merged with the ASSET (Association of Supervisory Staff, Executives and Technicians) to form ASTMS (the Association of Scientific, Technical and Managerial Staffs)

General Secretaries
1918: Norman Campbell
1920: Archibald Church
1931:
1935: William Alfred Wooster
1945: Roy Innes
1949: Ted Ainley
1951: Ben Smith
1954: John Dutton

Literature 
 Roy MacLeod, Kay MacLeod: The Contradictions of Professionalism: Scientists, Trade Unionism and the First World War, in: Social Studies of Science, Vol. 9, No. 1, European Issue (Feb., 1979), pp. 1–32

External links
Catalogue of the AScW archives, held at the Modern Records Centre, University of Warwick

Defunct trade unions of the United Kingdom
1918 establishments in the United Kingdom
Trade unions established in 1918
Trade unions disestablished in 1968
Trade unions based in London